Carbonated milk is milk that has been carbonated and sold for human consumption.

Although carbonated milk is not sold globally, it is a popular drink in East Asia.

Brands
Vio is a mix of flavored milk and carbonated water made by The Coca-Cola Company.

See also

Egg cream
Milkis
Ice cream float

References

Milk-based drinks
Chinese drinks
Hong Kong drinks
Japanese drinks
Korean drinks
Carbonated drinks